Jorge Luis Ramos Sánchez (born October 2, 1992) is a Colombian professional footballer who plays as a forward for Alvarado. He previously played for Real Cartagena, Independiente de Santa Fe, Fortaleza, Uniautónoma and Atlético Huila.

Titles
Real Cartagena
 Categoría Primera B: 2008
Independiente de Santa Fe
 Categoría Primera A: 2012 Apertura

External links
 
 

1992 births
Living people
Colombian footballers
Colombian expatriate footballers
Association football forwards
Sportspeople from Cartagena, Colombia
Independiente Santa Fe footballers
Real Cartagena footballers
Fortaleza C.E.I.F. footballers
Uniautónoma F.C. footballers
Atlético Huila footballers
Deportes Tolima footballers
Club Atlético Alvarado players
Categoría Primera A players
Primera Nacional players
Colombian expatriate sportspeople in Argentina
Expatriate footballers in Argentina